Funiculaire de Chaumont is one of the funicular railways in Neuchâtel, Switzerland. The line with a length of 2091 m has a difference of elevation of 570 m at an incline from 15% to 46%. It has four viaducts with a total length of 570 m.

The line was opened in 1910 as a single-track funicular with two cars and a passing loop.  A new tram line linked it to Neuchâtel railway station. It replaced a projected two-section funicular.

In 2007, the passing loop and the second car were removed.

The funicular is owned and operated by Transports publics Neuchâtelois.

References 

Chaumont
Transport in Neuchâtel
Metre gauge railways in Switzerland
Railway lines opened in 1910

fr:Funiculaire de Chaumont
uk:Фунікулер Ла-Кудре - Шомон